Boman Martinez-Reid, also known as Bomanizer, is a Canadian creator of TikTok comedy videos. His videos parody reality television by featuring his own family and friends getting into overly dramatized fights and feuds about small, everyday matters.

Martinez-Reid, the son of a Jamaican Canadian father and a Spanish Canadian mother, grew up in Mississauga, Ontario. and launched his TikTok account in 2019 while studying radio and television arts at Ryerson University. He broke through to mass popularity on the platform in 2020.

In 2021 he appeared in a second season episode of Canada's Drag Race as a celebrity contestant in the Snatch Game, and did work with The Gag, Comedy Central's internet-based platform for emerging LGBTQ comedians. In the same year, he was named as an Icon in TikTok's inaugural Discover List of top content creators on the platform, and was first runner-up for Best Local Comedy TikTok in Nows annual Best of Toronto reader poll.

He is out as gay.

References

21st-century Canadian comedians
21st-century Canadian male actors
Canadian TikTokers
Black Canadian comedians
Black Canadian LGBT people
Canadian people of Spanish descent
Gay comedians
Comedians from Ontario
LGBT TikTokers
People from Mississauga
Toronto Metropolitan University alumni
Living people
Year of birth missing (living people)
Canadian LGBT comedians
21st-century Canadian LGBT people
Canadian gay men